South Salem Township is a township in Greenwood County, Kansas, USA.  As of the 2000 census, its population was 127.

Geography
According to the USGS, it contains two cemeteries: Highland and Ladd.

The streams of Cat Creek, Coon Creek, Hog Creek, Ivanpah Creek, Oleson Creek and Otis Creek run through this township.

References
 USGS Geographic Names Information System (GNIS)

External links
 City-Data.com

Townships in Greenwood County, Kansas
Townships in Kansas